Sandra Kaye Bennett (born 25 May 1972 in Dargaville),  more recently known as Sandy Hitchcock, is a former field hockey player who represented New Zealand at the 2000 Summer Olympics in Sydney and at the 1998 Commonwealth Games in Kuala Lumpur and the 2002 Commonwealth Games in Manchester.

References

External links

New Zealand female field hockey players
Olympic field hockey players of New Zealand
Field hockey players at the 2000 Summer Olympics
1972 births
Living people
Commonwealth Games bronze medallists for New Zealand
Field hockey players at the 1998 Commonwealth Games
People from Dargaville
Commonwealth Games medallists in field hockey
20th-century New Zealand women
21st-century New Zealand women
Medallists at the 1998 Commonwealth Games